Ministry of Europe and Foreign Affairs may refer to:
 Ministry for Europe and Foreign Affairs (Albania)
 Ministry for Europe and Foreign Affairs (France)